Aliecer Urrutia Delgado (born September 22, 1974 in Villa Clara) is a retired male triple jumper from Cuba. Having set a personal best of 17.70 in 1996, he won a silver medal at the 1997 IAAF World Indoor Championships and a bronze medal at the 1997 World Championships. He is a former world indoor record holder with a mark of 17.83 metres. Urrutia retired after the 2002 season.

Achievements

External links

1974 births
Living people
Cuban male triple jumpers
Athletes (track and field) at the 1996 Summer Olympics
Olympic athletes of Cuba
World Athletics Championships medalists
Universiade medalists in athletics (track and field)
Central American and Caribbean Games silver medalists for Cuba
Competitors at the 1998 Central American and Caribbean Games
Universiade silver medalists for Cuba
Central American and Caribbean Games medalists in athletics
Medalists at the 1997 Summer Universiade
People from Villa Clara Province
20th-century Cuban people
21st-century Cuban people